Paroedura kloki is a species of lizard in the family Gekkonidae. It is endemic to Madagascar.

References

Paroedura
Reptiles of Madagascar
Reptiles described in 2018